Jose Garces (born July 6, 1981) is an Ecuadorian American chef, restaurant owner, and Iron Chef. He was born in Chicago to Ecuadorian parents. He won in the second season of The Next Iron Chef.

Early life
Jose Garces was born July 6, 1981 in Chicago, Illinois. He is the second of three children born to parents Jorge and Magdalena Garces and is of Ecuadorian heritage. He played varsity football and wrestled as a student at Gordon Technical High School. Garces studied Culinary Arts at Kendall College in Chicago, graduating in 1996.

After graduating from college, Garces traveled to Spain to gain experience in European-style cooking and cuisine, returning to the United States a few years later to work in New York City.

Career
Chef Douglas Rodriguez opened Alma de Cuba in Philadelphia with Garces as his executive chef in 2001. 

Garces opened his first restaurant in 2005, Amada, named after his grandmother. The Spanish tapas restaurant was followed by restaurant concepts with locations in Philadelphia, Chicago, Arizona, New Jersey, Palm Springs, Washington DC, and New York City. Following a few years of financial and legal challenges, Garces filed for bankruptcy in 2018 and sold his restaurants to IdEATion Hospitality as part of a restructuring. 

IdEATion, along with Chef Garces, now run seven restaurants in Philadelphia: Amada, Tinto, Village Whiskey, Garces Trading Company, JG Domestic, Volvér, and Buena Onda. IdEATion and Chef Garces also manage four restaurants at the Ocean Casino Resort in Atlantic City, New Jersey: Amada - Ocean,  Distrito Cantina - Ocean, Olon - Tropicana, and Okatshe - Tropicana.

Television
Garces has been a challenger on Iron Chef America, defeating Bobby Flay on a 2008 episode featuring melon.  He also competed in the second season of The Next Iron Chef and he was selected the sixth Iron Chef after defeating opponent chef Jehangir Mehta on November 22, 2009. Garces debuted as an Iron Chef on January 17, 2010, when he defeated Seattle chef Rachel Yang in Battle Hawaiian Moi. In 2023, Garces was a competitor in season 4 of Tournament of Champions.

Personal life
In 2002, he married Beatriz Mirabal, a dentist. The couple has a daughter, Olivia, and a son, Andres.

Awards and honors
 2009: Best Chef Mid-Atlantic, James Beard Foundation

References

External links
Garces Group
Amada - Atlantic City

1981 births
American chefs
American male chefs
Living people
People from Chicago
Kendall College alumni
American people of Ecuadorian descent
Food Network chefs
Iron Chef contestants
James Beard Foundation Award winners
Reality cooking competition winners